José David "Joseda" Menargues Manzanares (born 1 May 2002) is a Spanish footballer who plays as a right back for UD Ibiza.

Club career

Valencia
Born in Murcia, Menargues was a Valencia CF youth graduate. He made his senior debut with the reserves at the age of 17 on 25 August 2019, starting in a 2–1 Segunda División B home loss against Lleida Esportiu.

In July 2020, Menargues renewed his contract with Valencia until 2023, and was definitely promoted to the B-team. He scored his first senior goal on 29 November of that year, netting the opener for the B's in a 1–1 draw at Villarreal CF B.

Menargues subsequently became a regular starter for the Che, suffering relegation to the new Tercera División RFEF in 2021 but achieving promotion to Segunda Federación at first attempt.

Ibiza
On 2 January 2023, Menargues joined Segunda División side UD Ibiza on a 18-month contract. He made his professional debut six days later, starting in a 1–0 loss at SD Eibar.

References

External links

2002 births
Living people
Footballers from Murcia
Spanish footballers
Association football defenders
Segunda División players
Segunda División B players
Segunda Federación players
Tercera Federación players
Valencia CF Mestalla footballers
UD Ibiza players
Spain youth international footballers